Allyson Evans is an American biologist and the editor in chief of Cell Metabolism.

Education 

Evans has a PhD from the University of North Carolina where her studies focusses on cell and developmental biology. She completed her postdoctoral training at the Massachusetts Institute of Technology focusing on aging, under the supervision of Leonard P. Guarente.

Career 
In 2010, Evans joined Cell Press as an editor for Molecular Cell and became the editor in chief of Cell Metabolism in 2019.

References 

Living people
Massachusetts Institute of Technology alumni
University of North Carolina alumni
Academic journal editors
American women biologists
Year of birth missing (living people)